Toby Stevenson may refer to:
 Toby Stevenson (athlete)
 Toby Stevenson (footballer)